Adelheid of Katzenelnbogen,  (died Mainz, 22 February 1288) was a countess from the House of Katzenelnbogen and, by marriage, countess of Nassau. She is a direct ancestor of the Walramiam branch of the House of Nassau and of the Grand Dukes of Luxembourg.

Biography 

Adelheid was the daughter of Count Diether IV of Katzenelnbogen and Hildegunde. She married before 1250 to Count Walram II of Nassau ( – 24 January 1276). On 16 December 1255, her spouse divided the county of Nassau with his younger brother Otto I, on which occasion Walram obtained the area south of the river Lahn, containing Wiesbaden, Idstein, Weilburg and Bleidenstadt.

From this union came the following children:
 Diether ( – Trier, 23 November 1307), was Archbishop of Trier 1300-1307.
 Adolf ( – Göllheim, 2 July 1298), succeeded his father as count of Nassau, was King of Germany 1292-1298.
 Richardis (died 28 July 1311), was a nun in the St. Clara monastery in Mainz and later in Klarenthal Abbey near Wiesbaden.
 Matilda (died young).
 Imagina (died before 1276), may have married Frederick of Lichtenberg.

Walram died – allegedly in mental derangement – on 24 January 1276. As a widow, Adelheid was a Clarissan nun in Wiesbaden (in the summer) and in Mainz (in the winter). It is believed that Adelheid and her daughter Richardis led a very devout life.

The necrology of the St. Clara monastery in Mainz recorded the death of ‘Alheidis … comitissa de Nassowe’ on ‘Non Kal Mar’ in 1288, and her burial ‘in habitu soror’. So she died on 22 February 1288 and was buried in the St. Clara monastery in Mainz.

Sources 
 Cawley, Charles. Hessen in: Medieval Lands. A prosopography of medieval European noble and royal families.
 Cawley, Charles. Nassau in: Medieval Lands. A prosopography of medieval European noble and royal families.
 This article was translated from the corresponding Dutch Wikipedia article, as of 2019-10-30.

References 

Countesses of Nassau
13th-century women of the Holy Roman Empire
Year of birth unknown
1288 deaths